Baihua may refer to:

Language
 Written vernacular Chinese (白話文), the standard written form for Mandarin Chinese, in contrast to Classical Chinese
 Yue Chinese (粵方言), the Chinese language that includes Cantonese, native to people from Guangdong and Guangxi
 Cantonese (粵語廣州話), the native language in Guangdong, China
 Pe̍h-ōe-jī (白話字), the Church Romanization for Southern Min language, mainly used in Fujian and Taiwan
 Bai language (白語), the spoken language in Yunnan, China, used by the Bai people

Places in China
Baihua, Guangdong (白花), a town in Huidong County, Guangdong
Baihua, Sichuan (白花), a town in Yibin, Sichuan
Baihua Township (白桦乡), a township in Daxing'anling Prefecture, Heilongjiang
Hundred Flower Pond, also known as Baihua Pond, a small artificial lake in Jinan, Shandong

See also
 Bai Hua (1930–2019), Chinese author
 Hundred Flowers Awards, also known as Baihua Awards, Chinese film awards
 Hundred Flowers Campaign (1956), also known as the Baihua Campaign, a brief liberalization movement in China which was followed by a crackdown